Nantun District is an urban district in Taichung, Taiwan. It was a part of Taichung before the City and County were amalgamated in 2010.

History
The district used to be part of Taichung provincial city before the merger with Taichung County to form Taichung special municipality on 25 December 2010.

Nantun is home to Liming New Village, a planned community containing multiple government offices.

Administrative divisions

Nantun, Fengle, Fengshu, Zhonghe, Zengping, Chunshe, Chunan, Wenshan, Baoshan, Xinsheng, Yongding, Sancuo, Sanyi, Sanhe, Liming, Gouqi, Daye, Huizhong, Tianxin, Xiangxin, Wenxin, Tongxin, Datong, Daxing and Dacheng Village.

Government institutions
 National Land Surveying and Mapping Center
 Water Resources Agency

Education
 Ling Tung University

Tourist attractions
 Fengle Sculpture Park
 Fulfillment Amphitheater
 Ling Tung Numismatic Museum
 Rainbow Village
 Taichung Mosque

Transportation

 Feng-le Park, Jiuzhangli, Nantun, Shui'an Temple and Wenxin Forest Park Stations of Taichung Metro

References

External links

  

Districts of Taichung